Alberto Vázquez Rico is a Spanish (Galician) comic book artist and filmmaker born in A Coruña in 1980. He has received three Goya Awards for his animated films. His most famous work is Birdboy: The Forgotten Children, a feature-length animated movie based on his own graphic novel. He is also a drummer in the Mano de obra band.

Career
He studied on University of Vigo and University of Valencia. One of the co-founders of Polaqia comic-book creators group, he published his first album in 2002. His comic books include Freda (2003, with Kike Benlloch), Psiconautas (2006) and El evangelio de Judas (2007). His drawings were published in El País, he also illustrated works of Edgar Allan Poe and H. P. Lovecraft.

In 2011, together with Pedro Rivero, he adapted his own graphic novel, Psiconautas, in a form of a short animated film under the title Birdboy. It won a Goya Award and encouraged them to direct the 76-minute version, Birdboy: The Forgotten Children, which premiered in 2016. In the next year, Vázquez received two more Goya Awards: one for the best animated feature film and one for a short (Decorado).

On June 16, 2020, a trailer was released for his next feature film, Unicorn Wars, which is an adult animated film about the gruesome war against teddy bears and unicorns, or as the teddy bears call them, devils. A year after the trailer debuted, Vázquez and the crew of Unicorn Wars was at the Annecy International Animation Film Festival in a Work In Progress panel in which it took place at the Salle Pierre Lamy. He explained the production process, part of the plot, and the festival shown clips.

Bibliography

As Author and Illustrator
 Psiconautas (2007)
 El evangelio de Judas (2007)
 Alter Ego (2008)
 A Caza (2020)

Filmography

Feature-length

Shorts

Accolades

Goya Awards

Other awards
 2011: Award for Best Animated Short Film, Festival de Cans, for Birdboy.
 2016: Best feature-length animation, Stuttgart International Festival of Animated Film, for Birdboy: The Forgotten Children.
 2017: Jury Prize for Best Animated Short Film, Festival de Cans, for Decorado.
 2017: Best short film in International Competition, Short Waves Festival, for Decorado.

References

External links
 Personal website
 Blog on Blogspot
 Alberto Vázquez on IMBb

1980 births
Spanish comics artists
Living people